Paul Vinsnes (18 October 1794 – 23 August 1889) was a Norwegian priest and politician.

Biography
Vinsnes was born at Drammen in Buskerud, Norway. He was the son of Johan Fredrik Winsnes (1768–1838) and his wife Barbara Holm (1774–1828). His father had been a  parish priest to Råde in Østfold, later in Stange in Hedmark. His grandfather had been a Magistrate  for  the Gudbrandsdalen district of Norddalen  in Oppland. He graduated from the University of Copenhagen as cand.theol. with laud in 1814. 

He first worked  for two years as a teacher in Drammen, then a catechist at Our Saviour's Church in Kristiania (now Oslo Cathedral) before he became chaplain in Vang  in Hedmark in 1819. He was then appointed as vicar in Trysil in Hedemark in 1820, Hurdal  in  Akershus in 1822, Aurdal  in Nord-Aurdal in 1827. He was assigned to Brunlaugnes (now Brunlanes)  in Larvik in 1830 where he was also he was the first mayor of the municipality during the  period 1838–1846. He was elected to the Norwegian Parliament in 1839, 1842 and 1844, representing the constituency of Jarlsberg og Laurviks Amt (now Vestfold). 
 He subsequently returned to the priesthood as dean at Vang, Hedemark. He retired in 1870.

In 1817, Paul Vinsnes married Hanna Olava Strøm (1789–1872), niece of professor Hans Strøm. They had several children. Their great-granddaughter, Barbra Ring, was a notable author.

References

1794 births
1889 deaths
Politicians from Drammen
Members of the Storting
Vestfold politicians
Norwegian priest-politicians
University of Copenhagen alumni